The 2017–18 Copa Catalunya season, was the 19th season of Copa Catalunya.

The Final Four was played at the Pavelló Municipal in Salou. Tenea-CB Esparreguera won the title.

The All Star Game was played at Pavelló Nord in Sabadell.

Format

Regular season
28 teams are divided in two groups. The draw was July 28, 2017.

Final Stage
The Final Stage will be played in play-off ties in a two-legged format, with the exception of the final four.

Relegation PlayOffs
In the relegation playoffs, teams played against each other must win two games to win the series. The winners remain at Copa Catalunya for the next season.

Teams

Promotion and relegation (pre-season)
A total of 28 teams contest the league, including 15 sides from the 2016–17 season, three relegated from the 2016–17 EBA and nine promoted from the 2016–17 CC 1ªCategoria. On July 17, 2017, CB Cerdanyola Al Dia achieved a vacant on Liga EBA. On July 17, 2017, CE Sant Nicolau exchanges a place in the Liga EBA with CB Sant Narcís. On July 18, 2017, CB Cantaires Tortosa achieved a vacant on Liga EBA. Finally Aracena AEC Collblanc-Torrassa B renounces his place in Copa Catalunya.

Teams relegated from Liga EBA
CB Cerdanyola Al Dia
Outletmoto.com-CB Grup Barna
Basquet Sitges
Merchanservis CBS

Teams promoted from CC 1ªCategoria
FC Martinenc Basquet
Basquet Molins
CEB Girona Citylift
Maristes Ademar Badalona
Lliça d'Amunt
Vedruna Gracia
Circol Cotonifici Badalona
EsportXTothom-Basquet SAMA Vilanova
Recanvis Gaudi CB Mollet B

Venues and locations

Regular season

Group 1

Group 2

Relegation PlayOffs
The first legs were played on 13 May 2018, the second legs on 20 May 2018 and the third legs, if necessary, on 27 May 2018.

|}

Final round

Quarter-finals
The first legs will be played on 13–14 May, and the second legs will be played on 20–21 May 2018.

|}

Final Four
Games played at Pavelló Municipal in Salou

Semifinals

Third place game

Championship game

Awards

MVP
 Rubén Morales (Tenea-CB Esparreguera)

All Star Game
The 2018 Copa Catalunya All-star event was held on January 27, 2018 at Pavello Nord in Sabadell.

The White team won the game 92-70. The MVP of the game was Ruben Morales who scored 22 points along with 4 assists and Marquie Smith won the Slam Dunk Contest.

Rosters

Game

References and notes

Copa Catalunya
Copa Catalunya
Copa Catalunya